Philip Hutchinson (25 January 1862 – 30 September 1925) was a South African cricketer who played in two Test matches in South Africa in 1889.

Hutchinson was born in West Dean, Sussex, and attended St Edward's School, Oxford, from 1878 to 1880. In three years in the school's cricket team he took 253 wickets at an average of 6. He migrated to South Africa in about 1885.

Hutchinson made 29, the top score on either side, when Natal lost to the touring R. G. Warton's XI in early February 1889. He also took 2 for 14 from 18 four-ball overs. He was selected to play for South Africa in both Test matches a few weeks later, but along with most of his teammates he was not successful, scoring only 14 runs in four innings and not bowling. Those two matches were the extent of his first-class cricket career.

References

External links

1862 births
1925 deaths
People educated at St Edward's School, Oxford
British emigrants to South Africa
South Africa Test cricketers
South African cricketers
People from West Dean, West Sussex